Suicide and Life-Threatening Behavior is a peer-reviewed academic journal published six times per year by Wiley-Blackwell on behalf of the American Association of Suicidology.  The journal was established in 1971 by Edwin S. Shneidman.  Its current editor-in-chief is Thomas Joiner (Florida State University). The journal covers scientific research on suicidal and other life-threatening behaviors, including risk factors for suicide, ethical issues in intervention research, and mental health needs of those bereaved by suicide.

According to the Journal Citation Reports, the journal has a 2011 impact factor of 1.333, ranking it 45th out of 125 journals in the category "Psychology Multidisciplinary" and 60th out of 117 journals in the category "Psychiatry (Social Science)".

References

Further reading

External links 
 

Wiley-Blackwell academic journals
English-language journals
Publications established in 1971
Suicidology journals
Bimonthly journals